Un giorno di regno, ossia Il finto Stanislao (A One-Day Reign, or The Pretend Stanislaus, but often translated into English as King for a Day) is an operatic melodramma giocoso in two acts by Giuseppe Verdi to an Italian libretto written in 1818 by Felice Romani.
Originally written for the Bohemian composer Adalbert Gyrowetz the libretto was based on the play Le faux Stanislas written by the Frenchman Alexandre-Vincent Pineux Duval in 1808. Un giorno was given its premiere performance at the Teatro alla Scala, Milan on 5 September 1840.

After the success of his first opera, Oberto in 1839, Verdi received a commission from La Scala impresario Merelli to write three more operas. Un giorno was first of the three, but he wrote the piece during a period when first his children and then his wife died and its failure in 1840 caused the young composer to almost abandon opera. It was not until he was enticed to write the music for the existing libretto of what became Nabucco that Verdi restarted his career.

Composition history
After Oberto and after Merelli returned from Vienna in early 1840, he needed a comedy to be written for the autumn season. Asked to select a libretto by Romani which already existed, Verdi notes that he did not like any of them but "because the matter was of some urgency, I chose the one which seemed to me to be the least bad".

Performance history

Premiere and other 19th century performances

The first performance at La Scala on 5 September 1840 was a failure, and La Scala cancelled the remaining scheduled performances. They did not revive the work until 2001. Verdi would not attempt another operatic comedy until the end of his career with Falstaff.

At the premiere Verdi was seated in the orchestra pit, and thus heard the audience reaction directly. Along with the critics, Verdi acknowledged that the failure was partly due to his own personal circumstances, since his two children (the first in 1838, the second in 1839) and then, in June 1840, his wife Margherita Barezzi had died, all during the period leading up to and during its composition. A contributing factor was that the only singers La Scala's impresario had available were those assembled for an opera seria, Otto Nicolai's Il templario, and they had no experience with comedy: "The cast had been assembled chiefly for the performance of the season's most successful novelty, Il templario, Nicolai's version of Ivanhoe". Other factors which have been noted include the large size of La Scala itself (noted by George Martin as "too big for the piece") plus the rather old-fashioned nature of the work which was written in a style that was rapidly going out of fashion. In fact, in summary, Budden notes that "by the side of Donizetti's L'elisir d'amore or Don Pasquale, it cuts a clumsy figure".

Other productions in Italy during Verdi's lifetime seemed to fare better; it was given in Venice in 1845 (as Il finto Stanislao, where it did well), in Rome in 1846, and Naples (also as Il finto Stanislao) in 1859.

20th century and beyond

In the U.S., the opera received its premiere on 18 June 1960, while in the UK, the premiere took place on 21 March 1961. It was part of the San Diego Opera's June 1981 "Verdi Festival".

With the temporary shutdown of the Royal Opera House, Covent Garden in 1999, the Royal Opera gave a concert performance at the Royal Festival Hall. Russian baritone Vladimir Chernov sang the "King" with John Del Carlo as Baron Kelbar; Susanne Mentzer sang Giuletta. This presentation was followed in 2001 with a staged production at the Buxton Festival in England.

In October 2012, the Bilbao-based ABAO society, one which plans to present all of Verdi's works, presented the opera under conductor Alberto Zedda.

Sarasota Opera presented the new critical edition of the opera in March 2013, the 29th work of the complete Verdi canon (in all its versions) to be presented by the company. Dr. Francesco Izzo, Co-Director of the American Institute for Verdi Studies and the critical edition's editor, notes that:
This edition corrects a number of inaccuracies and arbitrary alterations present in other scores of the opera, which has often circulated under the title Il finto Stanislao. I have done my very best to provide an edition that faithfully reflects Verdi's intentions throughout.Carrie Seidman, "A critically close look at a little-known Verdi opera", Herald-Tribune (Sarasota), 23 February 2013

The Glimmerglass Festival presented the opera in a new English adaptation during the 2013 Festival.

Roles

Synopsis 

The Polish monarch, King Stanisław Leszczyński, an historical figure during the War of Succession, lost his throne after the Saxon invasion at the Battle of Poltava in 1709. He regained it in 1733, but was again deposed in 1736 and went into exile in France. The opera is set in 1733 when Stanislaw returned to Poland leaving a French officer, the Cavaliere di Belfiore, to impersonate him in France.
Time: 1733
Place: Baron Kelbar's castle near Brest, France

Act 1
Scene 1: A gallery in the home of Baron Kelbar 

Belfiore, impersonating the Polish king Stanislaus, is a guest at the home of Baron Kelbar and he comments to himself on his change of fortune: "Compagnoni di Parigi...Verrà purtroppo il giorno" / "Comrades in Paris...Unfortunately, the day will come". The Baron has recently arranged a political alliance by betrothing his daughter, Giulietta, to La Rocca, the Brittany Treasurer, but Giulietta prefers La Rocca's nephew, Edoardo. Another undesired marriage involves Baron Kelbar's niece, the Marchesa del Poggio, a young widow who is in love with Belfiore. She has become engaged to the Count of Ivrea because Belfiore has been unable to commit himself to marrying her, in spite of the fact that he does love her.

Knowing of the Marchesa's imminent arrival and concerned that she might reveal his false identity as the King, Belfiore writes to Stanislaw and asks to be released from his commitment. Edoardo reveals his predicament to the "King" and begs to be taken to Poland with him in order to forget about the woman he loves. In addition, when the Marchesa arrives and, upon being introduced to Belfiore as "the King", she pretends not to recognize him. Likewise, he pretends not to recognize her, but she is determined to test him by proclaiming her love for the Count: "Grave a core innamorato...Se dee cader la vedova".

Scene 2: The Garden of Kelbar's castle

Giulietta is alone with her attendants and expresses unhappiness in having to marry an old man: "Non san quant'io nel petto...Non vo' quel vecchio". When Baron Kelbar and Treasurer La Rocca arrive, followed in succession by Belfiore and Edoardo and then the Marchesa (who was planning to help the lovers), Belfiore draws the Baron and Treasurer La Rocca away on the pretext of discussing state business, leaving the young lovers alone with the Marchesa.

Scene 3: The gallery of Kelbar's castle

Maintaining his role as the King, Belfiore makes the Treasurer an offer of advancement which would include marriage to a rich widow. By accepting, he agrees not to marry Giulietta. When the Treasurer tells Baron Kelbar that he refuses to marry his daughter, the Baron is affronted and challenges him to a duel. To add to the confusion all around, the Marchesa immediately proposes that Giulietta and Edoardo be married immediately. However, the false King returns and proposes that he will decide on a solution that will satisfy everyone.

Act 2
Scene 1: The gallery of Kelbar's castle

Following the "King's" pronouncement, the servants are mystified and they sing a carefree chorus which leads to Edoardo seeking their support and announcing his hope of still be able to marry Giulietta: "Pietoso al lungo pianto...Deh lasciate a un alma amante".

Belfiore, the Treasurer, and Giulietta enter discussing the reasons for Baron Kelbar's opposition to his daughter's marriage to Eduardo. Giulietta explains that the young man's poverty is the main objection and so Belfiore immediately rules that the Treasurer must give up one of his castles and give over a sum of money to the young man, and then all will be well. The latter is somewhat reluctant to disobey his sovereign, but seeks a way out of his duel with Baron Kelbar.

Scene 2: A veranda overlooking the castle gardens

Belfiore and the Marchesa meet on the veranda, the former still unable to reveal who he really is. This incenses the lady, who boldly states that it is her intention to marry the Count of Ivrea. However, she cannot understand why Belfiore is taking so long to reveal himself and still hopes for his change of heart: (andante) "Si mostri a chi l'adora...". When Count Ivrea is announced, she takes a defiant stand (cabaletta): "Si, scordar saprò l'infido". Since Eduardo has pledged to join the "King" when he goes to Poland, Giulietta is determined to get the King to rescind the commitment. The Count enters and the Marchesa once again states that she will marry the Count. However, Belfiore immediately forbids the marriage for 'reasons of state' and announces that he and the Count must leave for Poland to deal with state business.

All express their feelings, but things come to a halt when a letter arrives for Belfiore. It is from King Stanislaw announcing his safe arrival in Warsaw and releasing Belfiore from his task of impersonating him. In return, the King has created him Marshal. Before dropping the disguise, the "King" proclaims that Giulietta and Eduardo are to be married and, having received Baron Kelbar's consent, reads the true king's letter and reveals his true rank. He expresses his love for the Marchesa and all ends happily with the prospect of two weddings.

Music

The music of the piece shows the influence of Rossini and Donizetti. The haste in which the work was written may account for some of the uneven quality some critics have noted. With regard to the recitatives, Gossett notes that "only his youthful comic opera, Un giorno di regno (1840), uses secco recitative".

Recordings

References
Notes

Cited sources
Budden, Julian, The Operas of Verdi, Volume 1: From Oberto to Rigoletto. London: Cassell, 1984. .
Gossett, Philip, Divas and Scholars: Performing Italian Opera, Chicago: University of Chicago Press, 2008 
Phillips-Matz, Mary Jane, Verdi: A Biography, London and New York: Oxford University Press, 1993 

Other sources
Baldini, Gabriele (1970), (trans. Roger Parker, 1980), The Story of Giuseppe Verdi: Oberto to Un Ballo in Maschera. Cambridge, et al.: Cambridge University Press.
De Van, Gilles (trans. Gilda Roberts) (1998), Verdi's Theater: Creating Drama Through Music. Chicago and London: University of Chicago Press.  (hardback), 
Kimbell, David (2001), in Holden, Amanda (Ed.), The New Penguin Opera Guide, New York: Penguin Putnam, 2001. 
Martin, George,  Verdi: His Music, Life and Times (1983), New York: Dodd, Mead and Company. 
Osborne, Charles (1969), The Complete Opera of Verdi, New York: Da Capo Press, Inc. 
Parker, Roger (2007), The New Grove Guide to Verdi and His Operas, Oxford and New York: Oxford University Press. 
Pistone, Danièle (1995), Nineteenth-Century Italian Opera: From Rossini to Puccini, Portland, OR: Amadeus Press. 
Phillips-Matz, Mary Jane (1993), Verdi: A Biography, London and New York: Oxford University Press. 
Pougin, A., Vita aneddotica di Giuseppe Verdi con note ed aggiunte di Folchetto. Milan, 1881. (In Italian)
Toye, Francis (1931), Giuseppe Verdi: His Life and Works, New York: Knopf
Walker, Frank, The Man Verdi (1982), New York: Knopf, 1962, Chicago: University of Chicago Press. 
Werfel, Franz and Stefan, Paul (1973), Verdi: The Man and His Letters, New York, Vienna House.

External links

Libretto
Brief synopsis in English
Aria database

Italian-language operas
Operas by Giuseppe Verdi
Drammi giocosi
1840 operas
Operas
Operas set in France
Opera world premieres at La Scala